Nazril Rahman (born 21 January 1993) is a Malaysian cricketer. He played in the 2014 ICC World Cricket League Division Five tournament.

In June 2019, he was named in Malaysia's squad for the 2019 Malaysia Tri-Nation Series tournament. He made his Twenty20 International (T20I) debut for Malayasia, against Thailand, on 24 June 2019. In September 2019, he was named in Malaysia's squad for the 2019 Malaysia Cricket World Cup Challenge League A tournament. He made his List A debut for Malaysia, against Qatar, in the Cricket World Cup Challenge League A tournament on 20 September 2019.

References

External links
 

1993 births
Living people
Malaysian cricketers
Malaysia Twenty20 International cricketers
Sportspeople from Kuala Lumpur
Cricketers at the 2014 Asian Games
Asian Games competitors for Malaysia